Green Light, green light, green-light, or greenlight  may refer to:
 actual green light, part of the visible spectrum of light

Arts, entertainment, and media

Films and television
 Green Light (1937 film), starring Errol Flynn
 Green Light (2002 film), a Turkish film written and directed by Faruk Aksoy
 "Green Light" (Breaking Bad), a season three episode of Breaking Bad
 Green-light, formal approval of a project to move forward

Literature
 Green Light, a 1935 novel by Lloyd C. Douglas
 "Green Light", the final passage of F. Scott Fitzgerald's novel The Great Gatsby
 Greenlights (book), a 2020 book by Matthew McConaughey

Music

Albums
 Green Light (Bonnie Raitt album), 1982
 Green Light (Cliff Richard album), 1978
 The Green Light, a 2009 mixtape by Bow Wow

Songs
 "Green Light" (Cliff Richard song) (1979)
 "Green Light" (Beyoncé song) (2006)
 "Green Light" (John Legend song) (2008)
 "Green Light" (Roll Deep song) (2010)
 "Green Light" (Lorde song) (2017)
 "Green Light" (Valery Leontiev song) (1984)
 "Green Light", by the American Breed from Bend Me, Shape Me (1968)
 "Green Light", by Girls' Generation from Lion Heart
 "Green Light", by Hank Thompson (1954)
 "Green Light", by Lil Durk from Love Songs 4 the Streets 2
 "Green Light", by R. Kelly from Write Me Back
 "Green Light", by Sonic Youth from Evol
 "Green Light", by the Bicycles from Oh No, It's Love
 "Green Lights", by Aloe Blacc (2011)
 "Greenlight" (Pitbull song) (2016)
 "Green Lights", by Sarah Jarosz from Undercurrent (2016)
 "Greenlight", by 5 Seconds of Summer from 5 Seconds of Summer
 "Greenlight", by Enisa Nikaj which represented New York in the American Song Contest
 "Greenlights" (song), by Krewella

Computing and technology
 Greenlight (Internet service), a fiber-optic Internet service provided by the city of Wilson, North Carolina, US
 Greenlight Networks, a fiber-optic Internet service in Rochester, New York, US
 Steam Greenlight, a service part of Valve's Steam software

Other uses
 Green Light (missile), a precursor to the Sea Cat surface-to-air missile
 Green light (UFO), a type of unidentified flying objects
 Green light, a manager giving a player permission to be aggressive; See Glossary of baseball (G)
 Green light, the "Go" indication on a traffic light
Green light, to order someone's assassination
 Greenlight Collectibles, a diecast manufacturer based in Indiana, United States
 A fictional drug in the TV show Black Lightning
Europol's Operational Task Force Greenlight in ANOM, an international law enforcement sting operation

See also
 Blue Light (disambiguation)
 Black light (disambiguation)
 Red light (disambiguation)

Light, green